Petr Petrov (born 28 March 1983) is a Russian professional boxer. He has challenged twice for a world title, at light-welterweight in 2011 and at lightweight in 2017.

Early life
At the age of sixteen Petrov moved to Madrid, Spain, as his parents worked there on business. He resides and trains there to this day, and speaks fluent Spanish as well as some English.

Professional career

Petrov made his professional debut on 10 November 2000, winning a four-round points decision against Gabriel Pedro Silva Guerra. Fighting almost exclusively in Spain for the next decade, Petrov received his first world championship opportunity on 23 September 2011, when he faced WBA (Regular) super-lightweight champion Marcos Maidana. In front of Maidana's native Argentine crowd, Petrov suffered two knockdowns and was knocked out in four rounds.

Throughout 2014, Petrov fought in the United States for the first time and participated in ESPN's Boxcino lightweight tournament, as part of their Friday Night Fights series. He won his quarter- and semi-final matches against Fedor Papazov (six-round unanimous decision on 21 February) and Chris Rudd (fourth-round stoppage on 28 March), and the tournament final on 23 May by stopping Fernando Carcamo in eight rounds. During this time he also won the regional WBA–NABA and WBO–NABO titles. On 30 September 2016, Petrov dominated Michael Pérez in bloody fashion to force a corner stoppage in the sixth round, which earned him a mandatory opportunity for both the WBA and WBO lightweight world titles.

On 23 January 2017, promoter Frank Warren confirmed that Petrov would face WBO lightweight champion Terry Flanagan on 8 April, in Manchester.

Professional boxing record

References

External links

1983 births
Living people
Russian male boxers
Super-featherweight boxers
Lightweight boxers
Light-welterweight boxers
Sportspeople from Ryazan
Russian expatriate sportspeople in Spain